The Pantingan River massacre (Filipino: Pagpatay sa Ilog Pantingan) took place during the Bataan Death March in mid-April 1942. Several hundred soldiers from the Philippine Commonwealth Army's 1st, 11th, 71st, and 91st Divisions on the march to the north of Mount Samat where the Pantingan River crosses the Pilar-Bagac Road were taken to the riverside. Most of them were shot, bayoneted or beheaded by the Imperial Japanese Army.

The atrocity was attributed to Japanese Colonel Masanobu Tsuji. Following Tsuji's abnormal order, which was considered to be a war crime and beyond his commission, the Japanese 122nd Regiment of 65th Brigade executed the US and Philippine soldiers in the Pantingan River. Colonel Takeo Imai, of another Japanese regiment, doubted the authority of the order. Imai ignored the cruel order and did not execute anyone.

Survivors of the massacre include Lt. Manuel Yan who later became the head of the Armed Forces of the Philippines and ambassador to Thailand. Another survivor, Capt. Ricardo Papa, a G-3 Officer of the 91st Division later became a Chief of Police in Manila.

See also
Battle of the Philippines (1941–42)

References

Massacres in 1942
Military history of the Philippines during World War II
Massacres committed by Japan
Forced marches
World War II prisoner of war massacres
1942 in the Philippines
History of Bataan
Philippine Army
United States Marine Corps in World War II
April 1942 events
Mass murder in 1942
Massacres in the Philippines